Camilla Thulin (born April 4, 1961) is a Swedish fashion designer. She is particularly known for having designed all of Army of Lovers' outfits, and for having given Swedish politician Lars Leijonborg his new "man of the people" image in the lead-up to the 2002 Swedish elections. Thulin designed Malena Ernman's gown worn during her Eurovision Song Contest 2009 performance, reported to have cost 400,000 kronor (€37,471).

She appeared in the first Army of Lovers' music video to their first single When The Night Is Cold (1988) posing on a piano.

References 

1961 births
Living people
Swedish fashion designers
Swedish women fashion designers